Gary Cowan (born October 28, 1938) is a Canadian golfer who has achieved outstanding results at the highest class in amateur competition.

Biography
Cowan was born in Kitchener, Ontario, Canada. He began to play golf at the municipal golf course, Rockway, in Kitchener, and found great rivalries there with such excellent players as Moe Norman and Gerry Kesselring. The three were coached by Lloyd Tucker.

Cowan reached the semi-finals of the Ontario Amateur Championship at age 17 in 1956, a record for a player so young.

He won the 1956 Canadian Junior Championship. His first national championship victory at men's level was the 1961 Canadian Amateur Championship, which was to be his only win, but he reached the finals on four other occasions (1959, 1960, 1964, 1968), and finished second at stroke play twice more (1974, 1978). Cowan finished as the low individual scorer at the 1962 Eisenhower Trophy, an international amateur team event, in Japan.

Cowan went on to win the United States Amateur Championship on two occasions. In 1966, he was victorious at the Merion Golf Club in suburban Philadelphia, after defeating Deane Beman in an 18-hole playoff. Then in 1971, he won at the Wilmington Country Club in Wilmington, Delaware, by sinking his approach shot on the final hole with a nine-iron for an eagle two. Cowan remains the only player to win the U.S. Amateur twice at stroke play, and he remains one of only two Canadians (the first was Sandy Somerville in 1932) to win the U.S. Amateur.

Cowan also won the Sunnehanna Amateur in 1964 and the Porter Cup in 1969.

Cowan has captured nine Ontario Amateur Championships, a record.

Cowan turned professional at age 52 and played on the Senior PGA Tour (now Champions Tour) for a couple of years with three top-10 finishes.

Cowan was inducted into Canada's Sports Hall of Fame in 1967, the Canadian Golf Hall of Fame in 1972, and was selected as the Canadian Male Golfer of the 20th Century in 2000 by the Royal Canadian Golf Association. Cowan is also a member of the Ontario Golf Hall of Fame. In 2003, he was inducted into the Ontario Sports Hall of Fame.

Cowan had a successful career in the insurance business.

Amateur wins (17)
1956 Canadian Junior Amateur
1961 Canadian Amateur
1964 Ontario Amateur, Sunnehanna Amateur
1966 U.S. Amateur
1968 Ontario Amateur
1969 Porter Cup
1970 North and South Amateur
1971 U.S. Amateur, Ontario Amateur
1974 Ontario Amateur
1975 Ontario Amateur
1977 Ontario Amateur
1978 Ontario Amateur
1981 Ontario Amateur
1984 Ontario Amateur

Professional wins
1968 Ontario Open (as an amateur)

Team appearances
this list may be incomplete

Amateur
Commonwealth Tournament (representing Canada): 1959, 1963, 1967, 1971 (winners)
Eisenhower Trophy (representing Canada): 1960, 1962 (individual leader), 1964, 1966, 1968, 1970, 1978
Americas Cup (representing Canada): 1958, 1960, 1961, 1963, 1965 (winners), 1967

References

External links
Biography at Canadian Golf Hall of Fame
Biography at Canada's Sports Hall of Fame

Canadian male golfers
PGA Tour Champions golfers
Golfing people from Ontario
Sportspeople from Kitchener, Ontario
1938 births
Living people